El Salvador at the Pan American Games.

At the most recent games in 2019, El Salvador took home 3 gold medals, quadrupling its gold medal count from one to four. The country also took home both gold medals on offer in bodybuilding, a sport making its debut at the Pan American Games.

Medal count

References